Sergey Vasilyev may refer to:

 Sergei Vasilyev (1900–1959), Soviet film director, editor, and screenwriter
 Sergey Vasilyev (actor) (1827–1862), Russian stage actor
 Sergei Anatolyevich Vasilyev (born 1982), Russian footballer